Neel Motwani is an Indian television actor known for portraying Advocate Neel Pathak in Yeh Hai Mohabbatein and Raj Bajwa in Waaris.

Biography
Motwani acted in the television series Waaris as Raj Bajwa. He previously appeared in Ye Hai Mohabbatein as Adovacte  Neel Pathak  and Bahu Hamari Rajni Kant, and other serials on Sony Entertainment Television, Colors TV and Zee TV. He gained popularity by playing a weird geek scientist named Devendra in the show Bahu Hamari Rajni Kant.

Motwani is also a gifted singer, guitarist and keyboard player.

Television

Filmography

References

Living people
Indian male television actors
21st-century Indian male actors
Year of birth missing (living people)